Pilodeudorix mimeta, the green-and-orange playboy, is a butterfly in the family Lycaenidae. It is found in Nigeria, Cameroon, Gabon, the Republic of the Congo, the Central African Republic, the Democratic Republic of the Congo, Tanzania and Zambia. The habitat consists of primary forests.

Subspecies
Pilodeudorix mimeta mimeta (Nigeria: Cross River loop, Cameroon, Gabon, Congo, Central African Republic, Democratic Republic of the Congo, Zambia)
Pilodeudorix mimeta angusta Libert, 2004 (north-eastern Democratic Republic of the Congo, western Tanzania)
Pilodeudorix mimeta oreas Libert, 2004 (Nigeria, Cameroon)

References

External links
Die Gross-Schmetterlinge der Erde 13: Die Afrikanischen Tagfalter. Plate XIII 65 h

Butterflies described in 1895
Deudorigini
Butterflies of Africa